Gérard Brosselin (5 October 1870, Paris, France – 12 January 1905, Paris, France) was a tennis player. He competed for France.

Brosselin was twice a runner-up in the singles event of the Amateur French Championships, losing in 1894 and 1896 to André Vacherot.

Grand Slam finals

Singles: 3 (0-3)

References

1870 births
1905 deaths
19th-century male tennis players
19th-century French people
French Championships (tennis) champions
French male tennis players
Tennis players from Paris